Vinica is a village and municipality in Croatia in Hrvatsko Zagorje.

According to the 2011 census, there are 3,389 inhabitants, in the following settlements:
 Donje Vratno, population 289
 Gornje Ladanje, population 949
 Goruševnjak, population 74
 Marčan, population 598
 Pešćenica Vinička, population 125
 Vinica, population 1,075
 Vinica Breg, population 279

An absolute majority of population are Croats.

Vinica is a site of ancient Roman vineyards. Opeka Manor, surrounded by a large park, and the Opeka Arboretum are also located in Vinica.

References

Municipalities of Croatia
Populated places in Varaždin County